Alsómocsolád is a village in Hegyhát District, northern Baranya county, in the Southern Transdanubia region of Hungary. Its population at the 2011 census was 303.

Geography 
It is part of the Southern Transdanubia statistical region, and administratively it falls under Baranya County and Hegyhát District.

Demographics

2011 census 
As of the census of 2011, there were 303 residents, 110 households, and 78 families living in the village. The population density was 61 inhabitants per square mile (23/km2). There were 140 dwellings at an average density of 28 per square mile (11/km2). The average household size was 2.43. The average number of children was 1.01. The average family size was 2.82.

Religious affiliation was 66.9% Roman Catholic, 2.3% Calvinist, 1.3% Lutheran, and 28.3% unaffiliated, with 1.3% declining to answer.

The village had an ethnic minority German population of 7.1% and a Roma population of 2.3%. A small number of residents also identified as Croat (0.3%) and other, non-native to Hungary (2.6%). The vast majority declared themselves as Hungarian (97.1%), with 0.3% declining to answer.

Local government 
The village is governed by a mayor with a four-person council. The local government of the village operates a joint council office with the nearby localities of Mágocs, Mekényes, and Nagyhajmás. The seat of the joint council is in Mágocs.

Transportation

Railway 
The station is on the Dombóvár-Bátaszék railway line and is operated by MÁV.

External links 
 OpenStreetMap
 Detailed Gazetteer of Hungary

Notes

References

Populated places in Baranya County